David Rees is a Welsh Labour politician who has served as the Dirprwy Lywydd of the Senedd since 2021. He has served as the Member of the Senedd (MS) for Aberavon since 2011.

Early life

David was educated at local infant, junior and comprehensive schools before moving on to Cardiff University where he gained an honours degree in Engineering and a post graduate teaching qualification. Upon completing his studies at University he bought a house in his home town and began a successful career in Education. He first worked as a teacher at Cynffig Comprehensive School in Kenfig Hill, then becoming a lecturer at Afan College before moving into Higher Education. Prior to becoming AM for Aberavon he was an Assistant Dean of Faculty at Swansea Metropolitan University. During his time working in Higher Education he gained a further post graduate qualification, MSc, and was studying for his doctorate.

Political career

Rees joined the Labour Party in 1982 and has been an active member ever since. He has held several positions within the Labour Party and was the Constituency Labour Party secretary for Aberavon between 2005 and 2011.

Before being selected as the Welsh Labour candidate for Aberavon, Mr Rees stood as the Labour candidate in the 2003 Assembly elections in the constituency of Brecon & Radnorshire and in the 2007 election for the South Wales West region.

He is a member of both Unite and Unison trade unions. Throughout his working life he has been a strong advocate for good working relationships with the trade unions and regularly raises trade union issues in the Senedd.

Mr Rees is currently the Chair of the External Affairs and Additional Legislation Committee, previously chairing the Health and Social Care Committee in the fourth Assembly. He is also a member of the Health, Social Care and Sport Committee, considering issues across the health, mental health, social care and well-being portfolios.  He also sits on the Committee for the Scrutiny of the First Minister and the Senedd's Chairs Forum.  In the fifth assembly he has also sat on the finance committee.

Through his role as the Chair of the Cross Party Group on Steel, he is actively involved in campaigns to strengthen our steel sector to make it a sustainable industry for the future. At the same time David also acts as the Chair of the Cross Party Group on STEMM and he strongly advocates the position Science and Technology can play in economic policy.  He also chairs Cross Party Groups on Nursing & Midwifery and Mental Health

His other interests include strengthen local communities, child poverty, youth engagement, regeneration and education.

References

External links

Official Website (non-Assembly)

1957 births
Living people
Welsh Labour members of the Senedd
Wales AMs 2011–2016
Wales MSs 2016–2021
Wales MSs 2021–2026